Oludamola Bolanle ("Damola") Osayomi (born 26 June 1986 in Ilesha, Osun State) is a Nigerian sprinter who specializes in the 100 metres and 200 metres. She is a four-time gold medallist at the African Championships in Athletics and won an Olympic silver medal with Nigeria in the 4×100 metres relay at the 2008 Beijing Olympics. She also won the 100 and 200 m sprints at the 2007 All-Africa Games.

Her personal best for the 100 m is 10.99 seconds, set in São Paulo in 2011. She studied business administration at the University of Texas at El Paso and represented the school in athletics in 2006. She was the original winner of the 100 m at the 2010 Commonwealth Games but was stripped of her title and banned after her doping test came back positive for the stimulant methylhexanamine.

Career
Osayomi's first international appearance for Nigeria came at the 2003 World Youth Championships in Athletics where she was a semi-finalist in both the 100 m and 200 metres. She began to compete in senior competitions the following year as part of the Nigerian 4×100 metres relay team. On her Olympic debut, her team came seventh in the women's final at the 2004 Athens Olympics and the team repeated that position at the 2005 World Championships in Athletics the next year. Osayomi proved herself individually at the 2007 All-Africa Games by taking a 100/200 m gold medal double before helping the relay team to the silver medal. On her world 100 m debut at the 2007 World Championships in Athletics, she made her way into the final round (finishing eighth) and set a personal best of 11.15 seconds in the heats. The Nigerian women did not reach the relay final on that occasion.

She opened the 2008 indoor season with a personal best of 7.19 seconds in the 60 metres and went on finish sixth in the final of that event at the 2008 IAAF World Indoor Championships. At the 2008 African Championships in Athletics she became a double continental champion, winning golds in the 100 m individual and relay races, as well as taking a bronze medal in the 200 m. Two personal bests came at that year's Nigerian Championships, as she claimed the 100 m title in 11.08 seconds (also a meet record) and won the 200 m in 22.74 seconds (half a second ahead of runner-up Gloria Kemasuode). This gained her the opportunity to represent Nigeria at the 2008 Summer Olympics in Beijing. She was a 100 m semi-finalist and a 200 m quarter-finalist. Together with Kemasuode, Agnes Osazuwa and Ene Franca Idoko she also took part in the 4×100 m relay. In their first round heat they placed fourth and reached the final as the fastest non-qualifiers. Osazuwa was replaced with Halimat Ismaila for the final team and they sprinted to a time of 43.04 seconds, taking third place and a bronze medal behind Russia and Belgium. In 2016, the Russian team was disqualified and stripped of their gold medal due to doping violations by one of the Russian runners, Yuliya Chermoshanskaya, thereby promoting Nigeria to the silver medal position.

She was not in the same form in the 2009 season; she was eliminated in the heats stage of the sprints and relay at the 2009 World Championships in Athletics and her season's bests of 11.31 and 23.41 seconds, both set at the FBK Games, were much slower than the previous year. In 2011, her fastest times of the year came at the 2010 African Championships in Athletics, where she won the 200 m, took the 100 m bronze, and set a Championships record in the relay alongside Blessing Okagbare. She was selected to represent Africa at the 2010 IAAF Continental Cup and following a fifth place in the 200 m, she won a relay bronze medal in a team comprising the top four 100 m runners from the African Championships (Gabon's Ruddy Zang Milama and her compatriots Osazuwa and Okagbare).

At the 2010 Commonwealth Games in New Delhi, Osayomi won the women's 100 metres but lost her gold medal after her B sample tested positive for methylhexanamine, which has only been recently added to the World Anti-Doping Agency's prohibited list. Ironically, before being banned she had said: "I don't know why they allow people to participate in the competition if they cannot follow the rules."

Achievements

Personal bests
60 metres - 7.19 s (2008, indoor)
100 metres - 10.99 s (2011, São Paulo (IDCM))
200 metres - 22.74 s (2008, Abuja)

See also
List of doping cases in athletics

References

External links

1986 births
Living people
Nigerian female sprinters
Athletes (track and field) at the 2004 Summer Olympics
Athletes (track and field) at the 2008 Summer Olympics
Athletes (track and field) at the 2012 Summer Olympics
Athletes (track and field) at the 2010 Commonwealth Games
Nigerian sportspeople in doping cases
Olympic athletes of Nigeria
Olympic silver medalists for Nigeria
Yoruba sportswomen
People from Ilesha
UTEP Miners women's track and field athletes
Medalists at the 2008 Summer Olympics
Doping cases in athletics
Olympic silver medalists in athletics (track and field)
African Games gold medalists for Nigeria
African Games medalists in athletics (track and field)
Athletes (track and field) at the 2007 All-Africa Games
Athletes (track and field) at the 2011 All-Africa Games
Commonwealth Games competitors for Nigeria
Olympic female sprinters
21st-century Nigerian women